Pieni tietosanakirja ("The Small Encyclopedia") (1925-1928), published by Otava in four volumes, was the second Finnish-language encyclopedia. It followed the earlier, eleven-volume Tietosanakirja.

Being published more than 70 years ago, Project Runeberg considers the original edition of Pieni tietosanakirja to be in the public domain, though this interpretation is contested by the letter of the relevant law. 

Otava also released two updated versions of the book, the first in 1952, the second in 1958–1959, both in four volumes.

References

External links

Pieni tietosanakirja at Project Runeberg.

Finnish-language encyclopedias
Finnish non-fiction books
1925 non-fiction books
Otava (publisher) books
20th-century encyclopedias
Finnish encyclopedias